Smithers is a surname of British origin.

Smithers may also refer to:

 Smithers, British Columbia, a town in Canada
 Smithers Airport, a public airport
 Smithers Secondary School
 Smithers railway station
 Smithers, West Virginia, a city in the United States
 Smithers Lake, Texas, United States

See also
Smithers Rapra, publishers of Polymer Library, formerly Rapra Abstracts
Smither